Auguste Hilarion, comte de Kératry (28 December 17697 November 1859), was a French poet, novelist, short story writer, literary critic, historian, and politician. He was the father of Emile de Kératry.

Life
Hilarion was born in Rennes in Brittany. Coming to Paris in 1790, he associated himself with Bernardin de Saint-Pierre. After being twice imprisoned during the Reign of Terror he retired to his native region, where he devoted himself to literature until 1814.

In 1818, after the Bourbon Restoration, he returned to Paris as deputy for Finistère, and sat in the Chamber of Deputies until 1824, becoming one of the recognized liberal leaders. He was re-elected in 1827, took an active part in the establishment of the July Monarchy, was appointed a councillor of state (1830), and in 1837 was made a Peer of France.

A member of the French National Assembly during the Second French Republic, he retired from public life after Louis-Napoléon Bonaparte coup d'etat of 1851. He died in Port-Marly.

Works
Contes et Idylles (1791)
Lysus et Cydippe (a poem; 1801)
Inductions morales et physiologiques (1817)
Documents pour servir à l'histoire de France (1820)
Du Beau dans les arts d'imitation (1822)
Le Dernier des Beaumanoir (1824)
Clarisse (a novel; 1854)

References

1769 births
1859 deaths
Writers from Rennes
Counts of the First French Empire
19th-century French historians
French literary critics
18th-century French novelists
19th-century French novelists
18th-century French politicians
People of the French Revolution
Members of the Chamber of Peers of the July Monarchy
French male essayists
French male poets
French male novelists
French male short story writers
19th-century French short story writers
19th-century French male writers
18th-century essayists
19th-century French essayists
18th-century French male writers